Sean Anthony Moore (born 30 July 1968) is a Welsh musician, who is the drummer and percussionist and occasional trumpet player of the Welsh alternative rock band Manic Street Preachers. He is cousin to bandmate James Dean Bradfield.

Early years
Born on 30 July 1968 in Pontypool, Torfaen, Moore attended Oakdale Comprehensive in Oakdale, Caerphilly, with his cousin James Dean Bradfield, and other future band members Nicky Wire and Richey Edwards.

Roles in the band 
Simon Price wrote in Everything (A Book About Manic Street Preachers) that "Sean Moore is quite possibly the only person in rock who doesn't take the Manics seriously". According to his bandmates, he is the band's "musical driving force". In their early days, he was often mistaken for a woman due to his long hair, naturally effeminate features and small stature. He is the only current member of the Manic Street Preachers who has not released a solo album.

Driving and football
Moore also has a strong interest in motoring, and set the 22nd fastest lap time around the Nürburgring, Germany, in an Audi RS 4 in 8 minutes 25 seconds. Manics singer James Dean Bradfield mentioned this before playing "Motown Junk" as part of the annual Rock am Ring festival at the track. Moore is a fan of Michael Schumacher.

Sean supports Liverpool Football Club and was present when Liverpool won the first FA Cup Final to be held at the Millennium Stadium, Cardiff in May 2001.

References

Sources 
 

1968 births
Living people
Alternative rock drummers
Manic Street Preachers members
People educated at Oakdale Comprehensive School
People from Blackwood, Caerphilly
People from Pontypool
Welsh rock drummers
Welsh socialists
Welsh songwriters
Welsh republicans